Gijima Group Limited (short Gijima) is a South African information and communication technology company. Gijima Group was founded by Robert Gumede, in 1995. It was one of the companies listed on the Johannesburg Stock Exchange (JSE) until May, 2015. On 18 February 2015, it was announced that Gijima was to delist from the Johannesburg Stock Exchange (JSE).

References

External links
 

Information technology companies of South Africa
Companies listed on the Johannesburg Stock Exchange